Debarun Pal (born 14 February 1987) is an Indian Film Director and Film Editor. He shoots and produces many of his films in his native Kolkata and India. He has directed successful and groundbreaking Bengali Films such as Norokhadok Brikkho in 2013 and Rabindranath in Time Machine in 2015, under his own production house The Emperor Studios. Debarun also wrote about Digital Lifestyle & Financial Education in his book Survival Guide of Digital India.

Filmography
This is a list of films he had directed::
 Norokhadok Brikkho
 Rabindranath in Time Machine

Awards and nominations
Rabindranath in Time Machine
 Ranked 6th in Kolkata Short Film Festival

External links
 Official Facebook: RealDebarunPal
 IMDB (Debarun Pal)
 Author Central

References

Living people
Film directors from Kolkata
Bengali film editors
Film editors from West Bengal
1987 births